Zone 71 is the only zone in the municipality of Umm Salal in the state of Qatar. The main districts recorded in the 2015 population census were Bu Fasseela, Izghawa, Al Kharaitiyat, Umm Salal Ali, Umm Salal Mohammed, Saina Al-Humaidi, Umm Al Amad, and Umm Ebairiya. 

Other districts which fall within its administrative boundaries are Abu Thaylah, Al Froosh, Al Mazrouah, Jeri Al Samir, Jeri Khabbab, Muaither Al Dasem, Muaither Al Meshaf, Rawdat al `Ajuz, Umm Shaharain, Wadi Al Askar, and Wadi Al Waab.

Demographics

Land use
The Ministry of Municipality and Environment (MME) breaks down land use in the zone as follows.

References 

Zones of Qatar
Al Shamal